A Guy Thing is a 2003 American comedy film directed by Chris Koch and starring Jason Lee, Julia Stiles and Selma Blair.

Plot
Paul Morse (Lee) and Karen Cooper (Blair) are about to get married in Seattle. During his bachelor party, Paul has a chat with one of the dancers at the party, Becky Jackson (Stiles), and they find that they have an affinity for each other. Paul wakes up the next morning and is terrified to see Becky in the bed next to him. Assuming they slept together, Paul rushes Becky out of his apartment and hopes never to see her again. He tries to cover up the connection for the few days before the wedding. Unfortunately, Becky unexpectedly shows up around town and turns out to be Karen's cousin. Even worse, Becky's malicious ex-boyfriend cop Ray Donovan (Munro) had Becky followed and photographed. Becky and Paul meet again to steal those pictures from Ray's apartment. Further problems arise with family and friends consistently showing up at the wrong times. Crabs, dirty underwear in the toilet tank, a horny best friend, and a best man/brother who is in love with the bride all provide for a week of wedding preparation hijinks. Through the snowballing of all his implausible lies and half-truths, Paul receives corroboration and support from an unexpected corner; what seems to be a coordinated network of other men, including friends, complete strangers and, to Paul's astonishment, Karen's own father; all who give the same explanation: "It's a guy thing".

Cast
 Jason Lee as Paul Morse 
 Julia Stiles as Becky Jackson
 Selma Blair as Karen Cooper
 James Brolin as Ken Cooper
 Shawn Hatosy as Jim
 Lochlyn Munro as Ray Donovan
 Diana Scarwid as Sandra Cooper
 David Koechner as Buck Morse
 Julie Hagerty as Dorothy Morse
 Thomas Lennon as Pete Morse
 Jackie Burroughs as Aunt Budge
 Jay Brazeau as Howard
 Larry Miller as Minister Ferris
 Matthew Walker as Minister Green
 Dylan Winner as Moni Young
 Fred Ewanuick as Jeff
 Lisa Calder as Tonya
 Victor Varnado as Hansberry
 Donavon Stinson as Mouthy Bar Guy

Production
Principal photography took place from November 2001 to February 2002, in Seattle, Washington and Vancouver, British Columbia, Canada.

The release date was originally slated for August 23, 2002 and then September 20, 2002 hence having a copyright date of 2002 in the credits, before finally being released January 17, 2003 in time for Valentine's Day.

Release
The film debuted at #7 in the U.S. box office, taking USD 6,988,749 in its opening weekend, before falling to #11 the following week.

Reception
On Metacritic the film has a score of 27% based on reviews from 29 critics, indicating "generally unfavorable reviews". Audiences surveyed by CinemaScore gave the film a grade "B−" on scale of A to F.

Dennis Harvey of Variety said that the film "does get slightly better as it goes along" but suggested that the multiple rewrites polished any creativity or originality out of the script.

References

External links
 
 
 Filming Locations at MoviePlaces.tv

2003 films
2003 romantic comedy films
Films set in Seattle
American romantic comedy films
American sex comedy films
Films scored by Mark Mothersbaugh
Metro-Goldwyn-Mayer films
20th Century Fox films
2000s sex comedy films
2000s English-language films
2000s American films